Torekov is a locality situated in Båstad Municipality, Skåne County, Sweden with 863 inhabitants in 2010. It is still a fishing village but it is today known as a summer resort.

In August, 1971 Torekov hosted a meeting in which it was decided to strip the king of all but his symbolic formal political powers, known as the "Torekov Compromise".

The name
According to an old legend, the town is named after a girl later known as Saint Thora who was drowned by her stepmother, found on the shore of Torekov, and buried by a blind man who then regained his sight.
However, the more prosaic explanation refers to two old words thora meaning height, and kove meaning cabin or hut.

Population From 1960 to 2010

References

External links

Populated places in Båstad Municipality
Populated places in Skåne County
Coastal cities and towns in Sweden